Ruscarius is a genus of ray-finned fishes belonging to the family Cottidae, the typical sculpins. These fishes are found in the eastern Pacific Ocean.

Species
There are currently two recognized species in this genus:
 Ruscarius creaseri (C. L. Hubbs, 1926) (Roughcheek sculpin)
 Ruscarius meanyi (D. S. Jordan & Starks, 1895) (Puget Sound sculpin)

References

Cottinae
Taxa named by David Starr Jordan